James Richard Stanhope, 7th Earl Stanhope,  (11 November 1880 – 15 August 1967), styled Viscount Mahon until 1905, and known as the Earl Stanhope from 1905 until his death, was a British Conservative politician.

Background
Stanhope was the eldest son of Arthur Stanhope, 6th Earl Stanhope, and Evelyn Henrietta (née Pennefather), daughter of Richard Pennefather of Knockeevan, County Tipperary and Lady Emily Butler. The Hon. Edward Stanhope and Philip Stanhope, 1st Baron Weardale, were his uncles.

Lord Mahon was commissioned a second lieutenant in the Grenadier Guards on 5 January 1901, and went with his battalion to serve in South Africa during the Second Boer War. Following the end of this war in June 1902, he returned with a large contingent of men from the guards regiments on board the SS Lake Michigan, which arrived in Southampton in October 1902.

Political career
Stanhope entered the House of Lords on the death of his father in 1905, and made his maiden speech in November 1909. He held his first office as Parliamentary Secretary to the War Office under David Lloyd George between 1918 and 1919. In 1924 he was appointed Civil Lord of the Admiralty under Stanley Baldwin, a post he held until the Conservatives lost power in 1929. The latter year he was also sworn of the Privy Council. After the formation of the National Government in 1931 he served under Ramsay MacDonald as Parliamentary and Financial Secretary to the Admiralty in 1931, as Under-Secretary of State for War between 1931 and 1934 and as Under-Secretary of State for Foreign Affairs, the last year under the premiership of Stanley Baldwin. In 1934 he was made a Knight of the Garter.

He entered the cabinet in June 1936 when Baldwin appointed him First Commissioner of Works. When Neville Chamberlain became Prime Minister in May 1937 Stanhope was made President of the Board of Education, and in February 1938 he also succeeded E. F. L. Wood, 1st Earl of Halifax as Leader of the House of Lords. In October 1938 he became First Lord of the Admiralty while continuing as Leader of the House of Lords. After the outbreak of the Second World War in September 1939, he was succeeded as First Lord of the Admiralty by Winston Churchill and appointed Lord President of the Council. He remained as Leader of the House of Lords and Lord President until Churchill became Prime Minister in 1940. However, he did not serve in the Churchill coalition government and never returned to ministerial office. He made his last speech in the House of Lords in December 1960.

In July 1940, Stanhope and several other national politicians—including Baldwin and Chamberlain—were targeted in the polemic Guilty Men. This publication accused these men of failing to prepare Britain for the looming war, and of appeasing Nazi Germany during the 1930s. The accusations made in Guilty Men have subsequently been questioned by some critics.

Family

Lord Stanhope married Lady Eileen Browne (1889–1940), the eldest daughter of George Browne, 6th Marquess of Sligo, and Agatha Stewart Hodgson, granddaughter of William Forsyth. They had no children. She died in September 1940, aged 51. With the death of Edward Scudamore-Stanhope, 12th Earl of Chesterfield in 1952, Lord Stanhope inherited the peerage titles Earl of Chesterfield and Baron Stanhope, but did not apply for a Writ of Summons for the more senior Earldom of Chesterfield, and continued to be known as The Earl Stanhope. Stanhope died in August 1967, aged 86. On his death both earldoms and the barony of Stanhope became extinct, whereas the viscountcy of Stanhope of Mahon and the barony of Stanhope of Elvaston passed to his nearest heir, William Stanhope, 11th Earl of Harrington. Lord Stanhope left his country seat Chevening to the nation.

Arms

References

Sources

External links
 

|-

 

1880 births
1967 deaths
British Secretaries of State for Education
Earls Stanhope
Knights of the Garter
First Lords of the Admiralty
Lord Presidents of the Council
Members of the Privy Council of the United Kingdom
Members of London County Council
Leaders of the House of Lords
James
Admiralty personnel of World War II
Earls of Chesterfield
Ministers in the Chamberlain wartime government, 1939–1940
Ministers in the Chamberlain peacetime government, 1937–1939
People from Chevening, Kent
20th-century English nobility
Lords of the Admiralty